The Airports Authority of Trinidad and Tobago (AATT) is a government airport management agency of Trinidad and Tobago headquartered in the Airports Administration Centre in the South Terminal of Piarco International Airport in Piarco, Tunapuna–Piarco, Trinidad. The AATT manages the Piarco International Airport and the Arthur Napoleon Raymond Robinson International Airport (formerly Crown Point Airport). It was established in 1979 under the Airport Authorities Act, No. 49.

References

External links

 Airports Authority of Trinidad and Tobago

Transport in Trinidad and Tobago
Airport operators
Government agencies established in 1979
1979 establishments in Trinidad and Tobago
Government agencies of Trinidad and Tobago